Dasht-e Ganjabad Ashayir Alidadi (also Romanized as Dasht-e Ganjābād ʿAshāīyr ʿAlīdādī) is a village in Sorkh Qaleh Rural District, in the Central District of Qaleh Ganj County, Kerman Province, Iran. At the 2006 census, its population was 50, in 10 families.

References 

Populated places in Qaleh Ganj County